Lexeiba or Lexelba is a town and urban commune in the Gorgol valley Region of southern Mauritania.

In 2000 it had a population of 12,233.

Lake Lexeiba is nearby.

References

Communes of Mauritania
Gorgol Region